Aleksandr Removich Robak (born 28 December 1973) is a Russian actor, director, film producer. He appeared in more than fifty films since 1999. One of the most popular and best Russian actors in the second plan.

Biography
Aleksandr Robak was born in the family of Ram Aleksandrovich Robak, a metallurgical engineer, and teacher Raisa Lukinichna. Since childhood, the main hobbies were a guitar and a school drama circle.

In 1994 he graduated from the Yaroslavl Theater Institute.

Selected filmography

Awards and nominations
Golden Eagle Award   
 2011:     Best TV Film / Series   — nom
 2014:     Best Supporting Actor (The Geographer Drank His Globe Away)   — nom
Nika Award   
 2014:     Best Supporting Actor (The Geographer Drank His Globe Away)   — nom

References

External links 

1973 births
Living people
People from Zlatoust
Russian male film actors
Russian film producers
Russian film directors
Russian male stage actors
Russian male television actors
21st-century Russian male actors